4-Iodophenol (p-iodophenol) is an aromatic organic compound. A colorless solid, it is one of three monoiodophenols. 4-Iodophenol undergoes a variety of coupling reactions in which the iodine substituent is replaced by a new carbon group para to the hydroxy group of the phenol. It is also used to enhance chemiluminescence for detection of cancer cells and in the Eclox assay.

4-Iodophenol can be prepared from 4-aminophenol via the diazonium salt. An alternative synthesis involves reaction of salicylic acid with iodine, followed by decarboxylation.

References 

Iodoarenes
Phenols